John Schoolcraft was an American politician.

He was a member of the New York State Assembly (Albany Co.) in 1816.

Members of the New York State Assembly
People from Albany County, New York
Year of birth missing
Year of death missing